The Tour of Misia Love Bebop: All Roads Lead to You was a concert tour by Japanese singer Misia, in support of her twelfth studio album Love Bebop (2016). The tour started on December 2, 2016 at Sendai Sun Plaza in Sendai, Miyagi and concluded on February 5, 2017 at Yokohama Arena in Yokohama, Kanagawa, comprising 17 dates. It is the twelfth and final installment of The Tour of Misia concert series, which began in 1999 and ran for 18 years. The final show of the tour was released as a video album on May 24, 2017.

Background
On June 20, 2016, Misia announced through her official website that she would embark on a new installment of The Tour of Misia concert series, the first in four years, since The Tour of Misia Japan Soul Quest. She announced thirteen hall dates and four arena dates. On August 19, 2016, it was announced Misia would be holding auditions for backup dancers to join her on tour. Ticket sales opened to the general public on October 1, 2016 for the hall shows and on December 1, 2016 for the arena shows. On November 15, 2016, Misia announced she had partnered with au to offer a limited number of tickets to their au smartpass subscribers. On January 20, 2017, she announced that the final date of the tour would be broadcast on Wowow on March 26, 2017. The network also aired a special program in anticipation of the concert, featuring an interview with Misia and footage of the tour on March 4, 2017.

Set list
This set list is representative of the concert on January 29, 2017. It does not represent all concerts for the duration of the tour.

"Love Bebop"
"Butterfly Butterfly"
"Escape 2016"
"Back Blocks"
"Rhythm Reflection"
"Change for Good"
"Catch the Rainbow"
"Ashita wa Motto Suki ni Naru" ("Love You More Tomorrow")
"Mayonaka no Hide-and-seek" ("Midnight Hide-and-seek")
"Shiroi Kisetsu" (Piano version)
"Nagareboshi" (Piano version)
"Sakura Hitohira"
"Orphans no Namida"
"Freedom"
"Super Rainbow"
"Oh Lovely Day"
Encore
"Into the Light" (David Sussman's Mix)
"Sweetness" (Satoshi Tomiie Remix)
"Aitakute Ima" (Gomi Remix)
"Candle of Life" (Make a Wish Remix)
"Wasurenai Hibi" (Hex Hector's Club Mix)
"The Glory Day" (Gomi Remix)
"Everything" (Junior + Gomi Club Extended Mix)
"Anata ni Smile :)"
"Hana" ("Flower")

Shows

Personnel

Band (Arena dates)
 Misia – lead vocals
 Tohru Shigemi – keyboard
 Shūhei Yamaguchi – guitar
 Jino – bass
 Tomo Kanno – drums
 Ta-Shi - DJ
 Hanah Spring - backing vocals
 Lyn – backing vocals
 Tiger - backing vocals
 Gen Ittetsu, Mori Takuya, Maki Cameroun, Kirin Uchida - strings

Band (Hall dates)
 Misia – lead vocals
 Tohru Shigemi – keyboard
 Shūhei Yamaguchi – guitar
 Jino – bass
 Tomo Kanno – drums
 Ta-Shi - DJ
 Lyn – backing vocals

Drag queens (Arena dates)
 Margarette
 Hossy
 Rachel D'Amour
 Mondo
 Lil'Grand-Bitch
 Dita Starmine
 Oz
 Miss Maria
 Iriza Lotion

Dancers (All dates)
 Calin Matsuo
 Kana Nakano
 Haruna Nakayama
 Haruna Sakamoto
 Kyo-ka Shimojo
 Miyu Suzuki

References

External links
 

2016 concert tours
2017 concert tours
Misia concert tours
Concert tours of Japan